The Australian Engineering Heritage Register is a heritage register maintained by Engineers Australia as part of its Engineering Heritage Recognition Program to recognise and preserve Australia's engineering and industrial heritage by recording the history of significant engineering works and by placing markers and interpretative panels at heritage sites. The register has no legislative standing.

The register was first established in 1984 and, by the end of 2016, had recognised 212 engineering heritage works.

See also
 
 List of engineering awards

References

External links 
 Official register of Engineering Heritage Markers (in date order, as at April 2017) (archived on 11 September 2017)
 Search the Australian Engineering Heritage Register (with full entries)

Heritage registers in Australia
Engineering awards
Economic history of Australia